High Tension is a 1936 American comedy-drama film directed by Allan Dwan and starring Brian Donlevy, Glenda Farrell, and Norman Foster. It was released by 20th Century Fox on July 17, 1936. The film was based on the story written by J. Robert Bren and Norman Houston.

Plot
Cable layer Steve Reardon (Brian Donlevy) is in a tank at the bottom of the ocean near Hawaii reading an adventure story "The Son of Neptune", written by his girlfriend Edith McNeil (Glenda Farrell) who based the stories on Steve's life. After repairing the cable he was sent to fix, Steve returns to San Francisco and asks his boss Willard Stone (Robert McWade) for a $1000 bonus and two weeks vacation so that he can marry Edith. Later, Steve and Edith have an argument, when he arrives hours late for their date and complains that she is taking too long to get dress. Steve, believing that Edith has been using him to get inspiration for her stories, storms out. At a bar, he meets piano player Eddie Mitchell (Norman Foster) and gets into a fight with two men who try to steal Steve's money, and is knocked out unconscious. The next day, Steve wakes up in Eddie's apartments. When Steve Learns that Eddie studied engineering in college, he offers help to his new friend to become a real engineer.

One year later, Eddie has become an engineer and together with Steve they return to San Francisco. Steve buys an engagement ring for Edith. He has not seen her since their argument. When Steve arrives at her apartment and finds her with the heavyweight boxing champion, Terry Madden (Joe Sawyer), the subject of her new series "Ladies Love Champions", he gets into a fight with Terry. Steve is arrested and Edith bails him out of jail. They agree to marry if their romance lasts more than 6 months. Steve goes to work for F. Willoughly Tuttle, while Eddie takes the position as superintendent of the Honolulu station. In Honolulu, Eddie encounters hostility from chief engineer Noble Harrison (Theodore von Eltz), who believes that he should've gotten Eddie's job. When Noble informs the head office that Eddie plans to correct a shifting coral formation which threatens to wreck their frayed cable by blasting; Steve convince the head office into sending him to Honolulu to help Eddie. When he tells Edith about the transfer and reveals that he agreed to stay on the job for one year, she becomes angry and ends their engagement.

In Honolulu, Steve fires Noble and begins to flirt with Brenda Burke, Eddie's secretary (whom Eddie has grown quite fond of). Brenda, tired of Eddie's lack of interest, accepts Steve's flirtation. When Steve spontaneously sends a picture of himself with Brenda in a bathing suit to Edith, she is furious and decides to go to Hawaii and give back his engagement ring personally. Meanwhile, in Honolulu Eddie warns Steve not to play with Brenda's feeling and Steve realize that Eddie is in love with Brenda. Later, Steve meet up with Edith, they spend the evening together and reconciles. When Steve fails to show up for a 6 a.m. blast, Eddie, trying to impress Brenda, decides to go ahead with the blast without him. After Eddie dives into the coral, his air line is blocked. Steve arrives and rescues Eddie as Brenda and Edith watch on shore. Afterwards, Brenda and Eddie embrace, and a telegraph arrives from the head office saying that if Steve marries Edith, he will get a five-year contract and that she has permission to travel with him and get her stories.

Cast  
Brian Donlevy as Steve Reardon
Glenda Farrell as Edith McNeil
Norman Foster as Eddie Mitchell
Helen Wood as Brenda Burke
Robert McWade as Willard Stone
Theodore von Eltz as Noble Harrison
Hattie McDaniel as Hattie
Romaine Callender as F. Willoughby Tuttle
Joe Sawyer as Terry Madden
George Chandler as Man at Honolulu Dock

Production
The original title for the story by J. Robert Bren and Norman Houston was "Here Comes Trouble", but 20th Century Fox used that title for another film which they released earlier in the same year. The working title of the movie was "Trouble Makers". The film includes the song "And That Woman Made a Monkey Out of Me" by Sidney Clare.

Reception
The New York Times movie review said: "High Tension is a loud and funny comedy written almost entirely in the vernacular, which is well suited to Miss Glenda Farrell's aptitude for robust comedy. Here she is aided and abetted by Brian Donlevy, the man with the profile, who spends part of his time asking her to marry him and, paradoxically, running out on her after she consents. Apparently for good measure, the scenario writers toss in some melodramatic episodes. For instance, the interlude in which Mr. Donlevy descends to the floor of the Pacific to rescue Norman Foster, who becomes entangled in a movement of coral reef while mending the Honolulu—San Francisco cable. High Tension may be recommended to the not too finicky as better than average hot-weather screen fare."

Home media
20th Century Fox released the film on DVD on December 16, 2014.

References

External links
 

1936 films
20th Century Fox films
American comedy-drama films
1936 comedy-drama films
Films directed by Allan Dwan
American black-and-white films
1930s English-language films
1930s American films